Studienrat [ˈʃtuːdi̯ənˌʁaːt] (male) or Studienrätin [ˈʃtuːdi̯ənˌʁɛːtɪn] (female; abbreviation StR), literally meaning "Educational Councillor", is an official German title for an official or civil servant mostly in the regular state-owned grammar schools in Germany. It is a denomination for an official in the so-called "higher service" (Höherer Dienst) as opposed to the "elevated", "middle" and "lower" service ranks. This office is located on the 4th "service level" (Qualifikationsebene 4) and remunerated according to "A 13" which marks the first salary level of "higher service" officials. Administrative officers of the same rank are usually called Regierungsrat ("Government Councillor"). The Studienrat normally works as a teacher in higher education up to the Abitur which corresponds to A-Level exams. In addition, the Studienrat serves as a teacher at vocational schools alongside Gewerbeschulräten (literally "Vocational School Councillors") and Fachlehrern ("Teachers with practical experience").

In the GDR Studienrat was an honorary title for a teacher.

Besides, there are also civil servants at ecclesiastical church-owned grammar schools that hold the title of a „Studienrat im Kirchendienst“ ("Educational Councillor in Church Service"), short „StR i. K.“ They are "officials of the church",  on a legal basis comparable to officials of the state.

During the Referendariat (practical part of the study), the title is Studienreferendar ("Educational Aspirant").

The following ranks are Oberstudienrat ("Senior Educational Councillor"), Studiendirektor ("Educational Director") and Oberstudiendirektor ("Senior Educational Director")

Prerequisites for the nomination and promotion 
Nomination of a Studienrat requires a master's degree in at least two subjects (e.g. Mathematics and Physics) and additional educational studies. The next step is a teacher training at an Educational College for mostly two years including practical training on the job, and a three-year probationary period at a grammar school.

Introduction of "Studienrat" as a title and its background in social history 
In 1918, Wilhelm II made a decree to replace the title  "Oberlehrer"  (upper teacher) by the honorary title "Studienrat". In Prussia, since 1892 two thirds of the grammar school teachers held the title of Oberlehrer, a third was addressed by the honorary title of grammar school professor: "Gymnasialprofessor". Oberlehrer were entitled to teach in higher education. As early as 1892 they were seen as equal to judges or magistrates, acknowledged as "higher service officials of the fifth class". This higher ranking and the coveted title of a councillor ("Rat") boosted the previously rather low social prestige of the grammar school teachers, a success mainly owed to the unremitting efforts of the "Vereinsverband akademisch gebildeter Lehrer" ("Association of unions of academically educated teachers"), founded in 1903, which from 1921 onwards called itself "Philologenverband" ("Association of philologians"). The teachers' union represented the professional interests of  the 95% of grammar school teachers who were union members.

As explained by the legal expert Rudolf Summer, the basic official title of "Rat" ("councillor") has to be specified by the obligatory supplement of "Studien" (education, studies) to convey the relation to schooling and education. This is meant to avoid the general title of "councillor". With respect to the title of director the supplement is expected to avoid confusion because "Director" like the English "director" is used for a variety of leading positions in different fields.

Attempts at the abolition of the official title and the decision of the Federal Constitutional Court 
According to the magazine Der Spiegel the town of Bremen has so far been the only federal state that attempted to abolish the official title of "Studienrat" in 1979 and to introduce the new title "Lehrer/in an Öffentlichen Schulen" ("Teacher at public schools"). After several prolonged judicial procedures, the Federal Constitutional Court decided that  official titles are not allowed to level off the distinctive qualities of different professional  levels of performance, they have to be differentiated, in order to indicate publicly the graded recognition of performance and to refer clearly to the area of service, in this case to education or schooling as opposed to administrative or military services.

References 

Education in Germany